Charles W. Endicott (October 28, 1822 – August 19, 1899) was an American attorney and politician who served as Auditor and Treasurer of Massachusetts, and was a member of both houses of the state legislature.

Early life
Endicott was born in Canton, Massachusetts to Elijah Endicott and Cynthia (Childs) Endicott, and attended the local schools.

He married Miriam Webb on September 30, 1845, and they had one child. He remarried to Augusta G. Dinsmore on October 2, 1848, and they had two children.

He was appointed a Norfolk County deputy sheriff in 1846. He read law, and was admitted to the bar in 1857.

Endicott served in Canton as a town clerk, member of the school committee, and representative to both the House of Representatives (in 1851, 1857, and 1858), and the State Senate (in 1866 and 1867).

State treasurer
In November 1875 Endicott was elected state treasurer for a term beginning in January 1876.

Endicott retired from the treasurer's office after his fifth term. Endicott had served five consecutive one year terms as treasurer and he was barred by term limits from running for re-election.

Endicott died on August 20, 1899, after fainting in his home, with heatstroke being identified as a possible cause. At the time of his death, he was thought to be in good health.

See also
 88th Massachusetts General Court (1867)

References

 
 

State treasurers of Massachusetts
Republican Party members of the Massachusetts House of Representatives
Republican Party Massachusetts state senators
State auditors of Massachusetts
People from Canton, Massachusetts
1822 births
1899 deaths
19th-century American politicians